Dalmanitidae is a family of trilobites in the order Phacopida that lived from the Floian (Ordovician) to the Devonian and includes 33 genera.

References

 
Dalmanitoidea
Trilobite families
Early Ordovician first appearances
Devonian extinctions
Fossils of Georgia (U.S. state)